Datura kymatocarpa is a species of Datura. It is native to Mexico and is an annual plant.

Contemporary experts classify this plant not as a separate species, but as a variety of Datura discolor.

References

kymatocarpa